McCarver is a surname. Notable people with the surname include:

 Jack McCarver (18961959), American racing driver
 Morton M. McCarver (18071875), American pioneer and politician
 Tim McCarver (1941–2023), American baseball player and sportscaster

See also 
 McCarver Neighborhood, Tacoma, Washington United States
 Morton Matthew McCarver House, Oregon City, Oregon, United States